Vincent Lionti (1959 – April 4, 2020) was an American violist for the Met Orchestra, and a conductor.

References

1959 births
2020 deaths
American conductors (music)
American violinists
Deaths from the COVID-19 pandemic in New York (state)
People from New York City
Juilliard School alumni